Tewel is a hamlet located approximately two miles west of Stonehaven, Kincardineshire on the Auchenblae Road in Northeast Scotland.

It consists of:
 Tewel Farm
 Tewel School and Schoolhouse
 Four semi detached houses
 One cottage (derelict)

Nearby places of note
Significant historic listed buildings in the vicinity include: Fetteresso Castle, which is also the site of Bronze Age discoveries< and Muchalls Castle, originally a 14th-century tower house.  Also in the vicinity are the villages of Auchenblae and Drumlithie, both considered part of the original region of Kincardineshire.

References

Villages in Aberdeenshire